Hyalochlamys is a genus of Australian flowering plants in the family Asteraceae.

Species
There is only one known species, Hyalochlamys globifera, native to Western Australia.

References

Gnaphalieae
Monotypic Asteraceae genera
Eudicots of Western Australia